Herbert Carter may refer to:

 Herbert St Maur Carter (1878–1957), Irish-born British military officer, doctor and surgeon
 Herbert Carter (pilot) (1919–2012), member of the Tuskegee Airmen
 Herbert Augustine Carter (1874–1916), English recipient of the Victoria Cross
 Herbert James Carter (1858–1940), English-born Australian schoolmaster and entomologist
 H. E. Carter (Herbert Edmund Carter, 1910–2007), American biochemist and educator
 St George Henry Rathborne (1854–1938), wrote under the pseudonym Herbert Carter
 Herbert S. Carter (1869–1927), American physician and writer
 Herbert Dyson Carter (1910–1996), Canadian scientist, writer, and Communist propagandist and organiser